Sangolli Rayanna was born on 15 August 1798 was a nineteenth century Indian revolutionary, military chief (Shetsanadi) and warrior in the Kittur princely state in the present day Indian state of Karnataka. He was the Shetsanadi of the Kingdom of Kittur ruled at the time by Rani Channamma and fought the British East India Company till his death. He died on 26 January 1831, at the age of 33. He belonged to the Kuruba Gowda community. His life was the subject of the 2012 Kannada film ''Sangolli Rayanna.

Activities 

Sangolli Rayanna participated in the 1824 rebellion and was arrested by the British, who released him later. He continued to fight the British and wanted to install the adopted son of King Mallasarja and Rani Chennamma, namely Shivalingappa as the ruler of Kittur. He mobilised local people and started a guerilla type war against the British. He and his guerrilla army moved from place to place, burnt government offices, waylaid British troops and plundered treasuries. Most of his land was confiscated and what remained of it was heavily taxed. He taxed the landlords and built up an army from the masses.  The British troops could not defeat him in open battle. Hence, by treachery, he was caught in April 1830 and tied up by the British; and sentenced to death. Shivalingappa, the boy who was supposed to be the new ruler, was also arrested by the British.

Rayanna was executed by hanging from a Banyan tree near Nandagad, on 26 January 1831 at the age of 33.

Rayanna was helped by Gajaveera, a Siddi warrior, in his revolt against the British in 1829–30.

Rayanna was buried near Nandagad. Legend says that a close associate Sangolli Bichugatti Channabasappa of Rayanna planted a banyan sapling on his grave. The tree is fully grown and stands to this day. An Ashoka Stambha was installed near the tree. A small temple in the name of Sangolli Rayanna was constructed at Sangolli village, in which stands a statue of Rayanna flanked by two wooden weights used for body building. Two wooden weights are original, those were used by Rayanna himself for body building. A community hall built in commemoration of Rayanna at Sangolli serves the villagers of Sangolli. Karnataka Government recently established Krantiveera Sangolli Rayanna authority its work progress of Krantiveera Sangolli Rayanna Sainik school, "Shouryabhoomi" Krantiveera Sangolli Rayanna rock garden and in "Veerabhoomi" Krantiveer Sangolli Rayanna museum.

In popular culture

Ballads and other memorials
The Gee Gee songs (Ballad) are heroic folklore verses composed in North Karnataka and several such songs are sung about Kittur Chennamma, Sangolli Rayanna and other figures of pre-independence Karnataka. A life size bronze statue of Sangolli Rayanna, riding a horse with open Sword in right hand, was installed near Railway station of Bengaluru. The main railway station of Bengaluru City has been renamed as "Krantiveera Sangolli Rayanna Railway station" in 2015. However the station officially re named and notified as "Krantivira Sangolli Rayanna" Railway Station on 3 February 2016

Film
In 2012, a film was produced on his life history. was the subject of another Kannada-language motion picture Kraanthiveera Sangolli Rayanna (Revolutionary Hero Sangolli Rayanna), directed by Naganna and starring Darshan, Jaya Prada and Nikita Thukral.

Citations

External links
Ballad

Indian revolutionaries
History of Karnataka
1798 births
1831 deaths
Kannada people
Indian independence activists from Karnataka
Indian military leaders
Indian rebels
Military personnel from Karnataka
18th-century Indian poets
19th-century Indian people
People from Belagavi district